Polka in Paradise is an album by Jimmy Sturr and His Orchestra, released through Rounder Records on July 11, 2006. In 2007, the album won Sturr the Grammy Award for Best Polka Album.

Track listing
 "Put a Light in the Window" (Jacobson, Roberts) – 3:18
 "Monopol" – 3:20
 "Polka in Paradise" (Bloom, Wing) – 2:49
 "Wake Me Up Early in the Morning" (Lord) – 2:07
 "Give Me a Kiss (Daj Mi Buzi)" (Biglietta, Mechem, Seibert) – 2:46
 "Dance with Me" (Marcarski) – 2:20
 "Roll Out the Barrel One More Time" (Dini, Pick, Wing) – 2:08
 "Zostalem Sam (Left Alone)" (Wojnarowski) – 3:08
 "Accordions on Fire" – 2:01
 "Miss Molly" (Walker) – 3:25
 "Sweet Memories of Yesterday" (Martin, Trimper) – 3:34
 "Ruby O'Reilly" (Wing) – 2:33
 "Diamond Ring" (Henry) – 2:50

Personnel

 Ray Barno Orchestra – Clarinet, Sax (Baritone)
 Phil Benenati – Cover Design
 Mark Capps – Engineer
 Dennis Coyman – Drums
 Ray DeBrown – Arranger
 Nick Devito – Clarinet, Sax (Alto)
 Joe Donofrio – Producer, Mixing
 Gennarose – Vocals
 Kenny Harbus – Trumpet
 R. Henry – Composer
 Allen Henson – Vocals (background), Group Member
 Ken Irwin – Producer, Mixing
 Kenny Jacobson – Composer
 The Jordanaires – Vocals (background)
 Johnny Karas – Sax (Tenor), Vocals
 Terry Kitchen – Liner Notes
 Dave Kowalski – Assistant Engineer
 Kevin Krauth – Trumpet
 Bobby Lord – Composer
 Joe Magnuszewski – Clarinet, Sax (Alto)

 Phil Martin – Composer
 Dr. Toby Mountain – Mastering
 Louis Dean Nunley – Vocals (background), Group Member
 Eric Parks – Trumpet
 Rich Pavasaris – Bass, Bass (Electric)
 Al Piatkowski – Accordion
 Tom Pick – Composer, Producer, Engineer, Mixing
 Mickey Raphael – Harmonica, Guest Appearance
 Rhoda Roberts – Composer
 Nancy Seibert – Composer
 Keith Slattery – Piano
 Jimmy Sturr – Vocals, Mixing
 Steve "Rocky" Swiader – Accordion
 Frank Urbanovitch – Fiddle, Vocals
 Bobby Vinton – Vocals, Guest Appearance
 Cindy Walker – Composer
 Henry Will – Arranger
 Lance Wing – Composer
 Uno Bloom – Composer
 Curtis Young – Vocals (background), Group Member

See also
 Polka in the United States

References

2006 albums
Jimmy Sturr albums
Grammy Award for Best Polka Album
Rounder Records albums